Gupp Chupp is a silent comedy, which was broadcast on SAB TV from 6 August 2016.

Cast
 Saanand Verma as Vivek Kohli (Owner Of Kohli Cake Shop / Always in sleep / Attraction For Bulbul Shethi)
 Monica Castelino as Lovely Kohli (Wife Of Vivek Kohli / Always have tricky idea to beat Shethis)
 Sahiba Khurana as Naniji (Mother Of Lovely Kohli / Attracted towards father of Sonu Shethi / Recurring role) 
 Palak Day as Tina Kohli (Daughter Of Kohlis / Friend of Bobby Kohli / Always wanted to unite both family
 Naveen Bawa as Sonu Shethi (Shethi Sweets Shop owner / Always have tricky idea to beat Kohlis)
 Sharad Vyas as Dadaji (Father of Sonu Shethi / Former Army officer / Supporting Role)
 Samiksha Bhatnagar as Bulbul Shethi (Wife Of Sonu Shethi / Selfie Queen) 
 Lavish Jain as Bobby Shethi (Son of Sonu Shethi / Friend of Tina Kohli / Re curring Role)

References

Sony SAB original programming
2016 Indian television series debuts
2016 Indian television series endings